Ridgeley may refer to:

Places
 Ridgeley, Nebraska, U.S.
 Ridgeley, West Virginia, U.S
 Ridgeley Township, Dodge County, Nebraska, U.S.

People
 Andrew Ridgeley, English musician

Other uses
 Ridgeley Sandstone, a sandstone in the Appalachian Mountains, U.S.
 Ridgeley School, a historic school building in Capitol Heights, Maryland, U.S.
 Ridgeley High School, in Mineral County, West Virginia, U.S., 1934-1976

See also

 Ridgley (disambiguation)
 Ridgely (disambiguation)